The 18201/18202 Durg Express is a Express train belonging to South East Central Railway zone of Indian Railways that run between Durg and Nautanwa in India. It operates as train number 18201 from Durg to Nautanwa and as train number 18202 in the reverse direction.

Coach composition

Journey

See also
 Mau–Anand Vihar Terminal Express
 Shalimar (Howrah) Express
 Pune–Gorakhpur Express

Transport in Durg
Transport in Nautanwa
Express trains in India
Rail transport in Chhattisgarh
Rail transport in Madhya Pradesh
Rail transport in Uttar Pradesh
Railway services introduced in 2003